Mikio (written: , , , , , , , , ,  in hiragana or  in katakana) is a masculine Japanese given name. Notable people with the name include:

, Japanese politician
, Japanese comedian
, Japanese composer, music arranger and producer
, Japanese politician
Mikio Hasemoto (1916–1943), American soldier and Medal of Honor recipient
, Japanese ice hockey player
, Japanese manga artist
, Japanese manga artist
, Japanese sport shooter
, Japanese alpine skier
, Japanese footballer
, Japanese ice hockey player
 Japanese jurist, educator and politician
, Japanese actor
, Japanese film director, screenwriter and producer
, Japanese athlete
, Japanese speed skater
, Japanese singer-songwriter
, Japanese chief executive
, Japanese mathematician
, Japanese politician
, Japanese keyboardist
, Japanese karate master
, Japanese scientist

Japanese masculine given names